Oppiella nova is a species of soil mite in Oppiidae family that can be found worldwide including Oahu, Hawaii and Okinawa, Japan.

It is among the few animal species capable of surviving on asexual reproduction alone.

References

Animals described in 1902
Sarcoptiformes